Matthew Lee Hughes (born 31 October 1978) is a Welsh retired badminton player.

Hughes had a career spanning 22 years, with over 100 caps for Wales, winning 10 International tournaments and competing at three Commonwealth games alongside reaching highest rankings in both mixed and men's doubles disciplines. Hughes is also a former Performance Manager and National Coach of Badminton Wales. He has coached players at all the major team events World Championships, European Championships and Commonwealth Games.

Achievements

IBF Grand Prix 
The World Badminton Grand Prix has been sanctioned by the International Badminton Federation since 1983.

Men's doubles

IBF International 
Men's doubles

Mixed doubles

References 

Living people
1978 births
Welsh male badminton players